"Turn Into" is the second single that released from Show Your Bones, the second LP by the Yeah Yeah Yeahs.

Track listing
"Turn Into"
"Turn Into" (Nick Zinner remix)
"Maps" (Live From Roseland)

Charts

References

External links
 The Yeah Yeah Yeahs
 Polydor Records
 Interscope Records

Yeah Yeah Yeahs songs
2006 singles
2006 songs
Interscope Records singles
Songs written by Brian Chase
Songs written by Karen O
Songs written by Nick Zinner